The 2011 season was the 97th season in Palmeiras's existence, and their 96th in Brazil's first division. Palmeiras will also play the usual state league, Campeonato Paulista, the national cup, Copa do Brasil and the continental cup, the Copa Sudamericana.

Due to the renovations taking place at Palestra Itália for the construction of the new Arena, Palmeiras played all their home matches of the 2011 season, at Pacaembu and at the Canindé Stadium.

Competitions

Friendlies
Palmeiras' first match in 2011 will be a friendly away against XV de Piracicaba on 12 January.

Campeonato Paulista

In December 2010, the FPF announced that Palmeiras will face Botafogo-SP at the Pacaembu Stadium, Palmeiras's temporary home until 2012, for the 1st Round of the Campeonato Paulista. On 11 January 2011, the FPF announced the schedule of all matches in the 2011 Paulista.

First phase

Last updated: 17 April 2011Source: S.E. Palmeiras

Second phase

Last updated: 2 May 2011Source: S.E. Palmeiras

Copa do Brasil

On 19 January, CBF announced the fixtures for the 1st Round of the 2011 Copa do Brasil. Palmeiras faced Comercial from the state of Piauí, playing the 1st leg away, on 23 February in Teresina and the 2nd leg home, on 2 March in São Paulo. Palmeiras advanced to the Second Phase of the competition, and faced Uberaba in Minas Gerais, winning by the score of 4–0 and securing a place in the Round of 16. In the last eight round, Palmeiras played against Santo André and won by the aggregate score of 3–1, advancing to the Quarterfinals.
In the 1st leg of the Round of 16, Palmeiras suffered a shocking defeat by the score of 6–0 to Coritiba, the team didn't play football at all and Coritiba was magnificent. In the 2nd leg, Palmeiras conquered a 2–0 victory at home against Coritiba, but it wasn't enough to achieve qualification to the tournaments semifinals.

First phase

Second phase

Round of 16

Quarter-finals

Campeonato Brasileiro

The draw for the most important competition in Brazil was announced by CBF in early April.
The first round is scheduled for 22 May.

Last updated: 5 December 2011.Source: S.E. Palmeiras

Copa Sul-Americana

On 28 June, the matches of the 2011 Copa Sul-Americana were defined in Buenos Aires, Argentina. All the Brazilian clubs participating in the competition will enter in the Second Phase and will play against another Brazilian. Palmeiras will play Vasco da Gama in a two-leg encounter.

Second phase

Overall statistics

NOTE: Starting appearance + Substitute appearance
Players in italics have left the club during the season
Luan, now nº 11, was nº 21 until 27 August
Chico, now nº 23 (previously Danilo), was nº 3 until the arrival of Henrique
Ricardo Bueno the nº 9, Paulo Henrique the nº 14, Gerley the nº 18 and Fernandão the nº 19, all arrived when their squad numbers were available and previously used by Wellington Paulista (nº 9), Vítor (nº 14), Max Santos (nº 18) and Adriano (nº 19) respectively

Starting 11

{| class="wikitable"
|-
! No.
! Pos.
! Nation
! Name
! Starts
! Note
|-
|align="left"|22||align="left"|GK||align="center"|||align="left"|Deola||align="center"|40||
|-
|align="left"|2||align="left"|RB||align="center"|||align="left"|Cicinho||align="center"|54
|-
|align="left"|4||align="left"|RCB||align="center"|||align="left"|Thiago Heleno||align="center"|48||
|-
|align="left"|23||align="left"|LCB||align="center"|||align="left"|Danilo||align="center"|26||
|-
|align="left"|6||align="left"|LB||align="center"|||align="left"|Gabriel Silva||align="center"|29||
|-
|align="left"|8||align="left"|RDM||align="center"|||align="left"|Márcio Araújo||align="center"|62
|-
|align="left"|20||align="left"|LDM||align="center"|||align="left"|Marcos Assunção||align="center"|59||
|-
|align="left"|40||align="left"|CAM||align="center"|||align="left"|Patrik||align="center"|29||
|-
|align="left"|19||align="left"|RW||align="center"|||align="left"|Adriano||align="center"|16||
|-
|align="left"|11||align="left"|LW||align="center"|||align="left"|Luan||align="center"|54
|-
|align="left"|30||align="left"|ST||align="center"|||align="left"|Kleber (c)||align="center"|44||
|-

Transfers

In

Out

Loaned in

Loaned out

Scorers

Disciplinary record

Clean sheets

Club

Kit
30 May 2010 – 31 May 2011

|
|
|

1 June 2011 – 21 August 2011

|
|
|

22 August 2011 – present

|
|
|

Coaching staff

Other information

References

2011
Brazilian football clubs 2011 season